Spectrum News (formerly Time Warner Cable News) is the brand for a slate of cable news television channels that are owned by Charter Communications through its acquisition of Time Warner Cable in May 2016. Each of the 15 regional channels primarily focus on local news, weather and sports coverage in their given areas, in addition to national and international news stories. With the exception of NY1, none of the six channels are available on other pay television providers in their respective markets, including Verizon FiOS, AT&T U-verse, DirecTV or Dish Network. In July 2022, Charter added all Spectrum News networks, including NY1, Bay News 9 and News 13, to their Spectrum TV mobile and smart TV apps within the 2200s tier of channels, allowing nationwide access to their full suite of networks for Spectrum subscribers.

Background
Time Warner Cable (at the time, a subsidiary of media conglomerate Time Warner) launched its first regional cable news channel on September 8, 1992, with the rollout of the New York City-based NY1. The provider later acquired GRC9News in Rochester, New York in 1995 (the result of Time Warner Cable assuming franchise rights in the area), and launched two more channels in Florida in 1997, Bay News 9 in Tampa and Central Florida News 13 in Orlando (which were both spun off to Bright House Networks in 2001). These were followed by the launches of News 8 Austin in 1999, News 14 Carolina and News 24 Houston in 2002 and News 9 San Antonio in 2003 (the latter two channels would shut down in 2004), Capital News 9 in 2002, and finally News 10 Now in 2003. A Milwaukee channel was at one point in the planning stages, but a local sports channel was launched instead. For almost all of the channels (excepting NY1), graphic designer John Christopher Burns (previously employed by then-sister company Turner Broadcasting in the 1980s) was responsible for the creation of the logo and overall looks for every channel, beginning with Bay News 9 in 1997.

In August 2009, TWC launched YNN Buffalo on its Buffalo, New York area systems; the "YNN" brand (which stood for "Your News Now") was later adopted that August on its Rochester news channel (then known as "R News"). On February 12, 2010, Time Warner Cable announced plans to have the remainder of its New York-based news channels – with the exception of NY1 – adopt the "YNN" brand that March. In March 2010, Time Warner Cable announced plans to expand the brand to News 8 Austin and News 14 Carolina. News 8 gradually made the transition first, beginning with the adoption of the "YNN Austin" brand on its Facebook and Twitter accounts. The branding change was implemented on that channel on January 10, 2011; however, News 14 would ultimately retain its name for another two years.

On March 14, 2013, Time Warner Cable announced plans to rebrand NY1, News 14 Carolina and the Your News Now networks under the uniform brand TWC News by the end of the year, along with the adoption of new on-air logos and a standardized graphics and music package for each of the channels. The reasoning for the name change was due to the perception by the company that Time Warner Cable subscribers did not know that the provider owns its regional news channels and are largely exclusive to its systems (NY1 is an exception, as it is also carried by the other major cable provider in the New York City market, Cablevision).

On November 20, after objections from Time Warner Cable subscribers over the planned rebranding, the provider announced that it would append the "Time Warner Cable News" brand to the beginning of the NY1 name, while "NY1" would continue to be used on-air as a primary brand. The revised branding as well as the new graphics and music package went into effect on all of TWC's regional news channels on December 16, 2013 (NY1 utilized a modified version of the logo used by the channel since 2001, amended alongside the "Time Warner Cable News" logo).

With the acquisition of TWC by Charter Communications in 2016, the "Time Warner Cable News" branding was dropped from all networks in favor of "Spectrum News," after Charter's primary consumer brand, on September 20, 2016 (except for NY1, which also incorporates the "Spectrum News" brand into its name though still continuing to use the NY1 brand on air). Similarly, TWC's various regional sports networks were rebranded under the umbrella of "Spectrum Sports" under a transition period, when they were wound down and those operations merged into new Spectrum News operations.

Programming

Each of the Spectrum News channels utilize a half-hour news "wheel" format and carry newscasts at least 20 hours a day. Weather reports are broadcast every 10 minutes at all times ending in "1" (for example, 7:01 a.m. or 5:31 p.m.); a brief minute-long roundup of the hour's major headlines (titled either "Top Stories" or "Spectrum News Minute") airs at the top and bottom of each hour. Each channel also carries live traffic reports based out of their local newsrooms and each maintains its own local assignment desk, on-air staff (anchors, reporters/videojournalists/meteorologists and sports staff), producers and news management.

Spectrum News operates on a model of not carrying news about violent crimes, common auto accidents and fires (known in the industry as 'if it bleeds, it leads' journalism), unless a story involving one is so large and affecting, that coverage is effectively required to remain competitive. In Los Angeles specifically, it has stated that it will not carry coverage of live freeway car chases, a common feature of the broadcast news operations in Los Angeles. Spectrum News channels will also go off the wheel occasionally for live continuous breaking news coverage, such as press conferences for news and sports events, along with live segments or continuous coverage past scheduled live hours for severe weather coverage; some channels also host political debates for local and state candidates. National news events such as the State of the Union, presidential news conferences, and other events considered to be of significant interest are also covered live, depending on the local Spectrum News division's editorial judgement, or may be hubbed to the network's New York headquarters or Washington bureau, as was done with overall coverage of the 2021 storming of the United States Capitol.

Franchise news segments are also syndicated to all of the Spectrum News channels (these include Cooking at Home, a daily cooking segment hosted by Dan Eaton; The Getaway Guy, a travel segment hosted by Mike O'Brian, who also provides traffic reports for Spectrum News' channels in Upstate New York; From the Floor, a weekday financial news segment from the New York Stock Exchange; and Tech Talk, a technology news segment hosted by Adam Balkin).

In addition to sharing weather (and in some cases, sports) content, Spectrum News' four regional news channels in upstate New York – Spectrum News Buffalo, Spectrum News Rochester, Spectrum News Central New York and Spectrum News Capital Region – share content with New York City sister channel NY1, which operates separately from the other Spectrum News channels in the state. The four channels also simulcast the political program Capital Tonight, which is hosted by former Susan Arbetter, formerly of WCNY's “The Capital Pressroom” and is produced out of Spectrum News Capital Region's studios in Albany, at 7:00 p.m. Eastern Time. The network also maintains a bureau in Washington, D.C. for national political news.

Charter also operated Spectrum Sports channels in the same markets as well as many others. In fall 2017, markets that had both Spectrum News and Spectrum Sports stations were consolidated, with Spectrum News stations taking on sports programming and the Spectrum Sports outlets being eliminated.

Channels

Spectrum News 1 Austin

Spectrum News 1 Austin serves portions of central and south-central Texas. Headquartered in the state capital of Austin, it was launched on September 13, 1999 as News 8 Austin. On January 10, 2011, the channel was renamed as YNN Austin, becoming the last of Time Warner Cable's news channels to adopt the "YNN" brand. The channel adopted its name, Time Warner Cable News Austin, on December 16, 2013. It then changed its name to Spectrum News Austin on September 20, 2016 and again to Spectrum News 1 Austin in 2021.

Spectrum News 1 Buffalo

Spectrum News 1 Buffalo serves the Buffalo region of upstate New York. The channel launched at 7:00 p.m. Eastern Time on March 25, 2009 as YNN Buffalo, becoming the first news channel owned by TWC to use the now-former "YNN" ("Your News Now") brand. The channel is available in almost all of western New York except for portions of Cattaraugus County that are served by Atlantic Broadband. The channel adopted the name Time Warner Cable News Buffalo, on December 16, 2013. It then changed its name to Spectrum News Buffalo on September 20, 2016 and again to Spectrum News 1 Buffalo in 2021.

Spectrum News 1 Capital Region/Hudson Valley

Spectrum News 1 Capital Region primarily serves the Capital District region of upstate New York, and maintains a subfeed for the Hudson Valley region. The channel launched on October 11, 2002 as Capital News 9 (launching nearly a year behind schedule due to various infrastructure and staffing delays). In August 2006, Capital News 9 expanded its reach to systems within eastern New York that Time Warner Cable had recently acquired from Adelphia Communications. In March 2010, as part of a rebranding of Time Warner Cable's regional news channels statewide, Capital News 9 adopted the "YNN" brand, rebranding as YNN Capital Region. The channel rebranded as Time Warner Cable News Capital Region on December 16, 2013; its subfeed, YNN Hudson Valley, rebranded accordingly as Time Warner Cable News Hudson Valley. It again rebranded as Spectrum News Capital Region/Hudson Valley on September 20, 2016, and adopted its current name, Spectrum News 1 Capital Region/Hudson Valley in 2021.

Spectrum News Central New York/Southern Tier/North Country

Spectrum News Central New York serves the central portions of upstate New York. Headquartered in Syracuse, it also operates subfeeds for the Southern Tier and the North Country regions of the state, encompassing the western and northern Adirondacks. The channel launched in November 2003 as News 10 Now. In February 2007, the channel launched a separate feed focused on Binghamton, Elmira, Corning and surrounding areas.

Due to the presence of ABC affiliate WSYR-TV, which broadcasts on VHF channel 9, it is the only one of Spectrum's news channels in upstate New York that is not carried on channel 9 in its primary markets; it is instead carried on either channel 10 or channel 14. In March 2010, as part of a rebranding of Time Warner Cable's regional news channels statewide, News 10 Now adopted the "YNN" brand, rebranding as YNN Central New York. The channel adopted its current name, Time Warner Cable News Central New York, on December 16, 2013; its subfeed, YNN Southern Tier and YNN North Country, were accordingly and respectively rebranded as Time Warner Cable News Southern Tier and Time Warner Cable News North Country on that date.  It then changed its name to Spectrum News Central New York/Southern Tier/North Country on September 20, 2016.

Spectrum News 1 Dallas-Fort Worth
Spectrum News 1 was launched in Dallas-Fort Worth in October 2020, serving the provider's systems in Dallas and Fort Worth, as well as Wichita Falls. It also serves Southern and Western regions in Texas, adding to Spectrum's existing coverage of Austin and San Antonio. The official launch date for the DFW bureau was October 16, with a team of more than a dozen anchors and meteorologists including Brett Shipp, veteran reporter previously at WFAA, and Charles Divins, former morning anchor at WDSU-TV in New Orleans. As of July 15, 2022, Spectrum News 1 Dallas-Fort Worth is available over-the-air via KAZD.

Spectrum News 1 North Carolina

Spectrum News 1 North Carolina serves the entire state of North Carolina, with individual feeds for four regions within the state (the Research Triangle, the Piedmont Triad, Charlotte and Wilmington) that are carried on Spectrum's systems in the respective markets. The channel originally launched as News 14 Carolina on March 22, 2002 in Raleigh; this was followed two months later on June 14 by the launch of its Charlotte feed, and later by sub-feeds for the Piedmont Triad on September 25, 2006 and Wilmington on August 18, 2008. The channel adopted the name Time Warner Cable News North Carolina on December 16, 2013, and changed its name to Spectrum News North Carolina on September 20, 2016.

Spectrum News Rochester

Spectrum News Rochester serves Rochester, New York and surrounding areas. The channel launched on April 22, 1987 as "WGRC" (for the city's cable provider at the time, Greater Rochester Cablevision); as such, it is the oldest channel among the Time Warner Cable News networks and the only one that was not launched by the provider. In 1992, Greater Rochester Cablevision moved "WGRC" to channel 9 and rebranded it as GRC9News. In April 1995, after Time Warner Cable acquired the cable television franchise rights for the area, the channel was renamed R News and was converted into a 24-hour news channel.

In 2005, some of R News' operations were merged with two of its sister news networks in other parts of New York, Syracuse-based News 10 Now and Albany-based Capital News 9. On August 4, 2009, the channel rebranded as YNN Rochester, becoming the second TWC-owned news channel (after Buffalo-based sister channel YNN Buffalo) to adopt the "YNN" brand. The channel adopted its newest former name, Time Warner Cable News Rochester, on December 16, 2013.  It then changed its name to Spectrum News Rochester on September 20, 2016.

Spectrum News 1 (Kentucky/Southwestern Ohio/Southern Indiana)
Spectrum News 1 serves Louisville, Lexington, Paducah, Owensboro/Evansville, Indiana, and all other Kentucky communities in which Spectrum provides cable television service, including the Northern Kentucky portion of the Cincinnati, Ohio market. Louisville, Lexington, Northern Kentucky and several other Kentucky cable markets were once served by legacy Insight Communications systems until the company was acquired by Time Warner Cable in 2012, and are now a part of Spectrum and Charter Communications. Along with Rochester, this variant of Spectrum News 1 is the only Spectrum News network not founded under Time Warner Cable or Charter ownership. The network dated back to the late 2000s as cn|2 (standing for "Community Network", and its main standard definition cable channel 2 slot) under Insight Communications ownership, and aired limited news updates, along with rolling weather updates. The network's service has slowly expanded over time under Time Warner and Charter ownership, now featuring political programs covering the Commonwealth, sports coverage, along with continuous weather coverage. The cn|2 name was retained until Spectrum took control of Time Warner Cable.

On October 29, 2018, the network was re-launched under the current name, replacing looped weather forecasts with rolling news and weather coverage from studios based in Louisville. The relaunch also saw the channel move universally to channel 1, displacing Spectrum's video on demand service to a channel 999 shortcut.

Spectrum News 1 (Ohio)
On November 7, 2018, Spectrum News 1 Ohio was launched as a 24-hour, statewide news channel. It serves Ohio's 3 largest cities, Cleveland, Columbus, and Cincinnati, as well as the majority of the state with three regional feeds of news and localized weather forecasts. Positioning itself as "Always Ohio. Always Refreshing. Always On.", Spectrum News 1 focuses less on sensationalism and crime stories and more on in-depth journalism, community stories, and local weather coverage. Taking over the affiliation with the Ohio High School Athletic Association from Spectrum's now-defunct sports channel, Spectrum Sports, Charter's Spectrum News 1 is the home of the Ohio High School Football and Basketball championships, other live high school games, select Dayton Flyers basketball games, and Ohio State athletics coverage. The channel is only available to Spectrum subscribers on channel 1.

Spectrum News 1 (Southern California)
On November 16, 2018, Spectrum News 1 Southern California was launched as a 24-hour, all-local news channel to serve most of Southern California. The channel is only available to Charter Spectrum subscribers. It offers the morning news show The Beat on 1 as well as local newscasts throughout the day. It is not available to all Charter Spectrum subscribers as the Bakersfield, California area does not seem to have a channel.

Spectrum News 1 (Wisconsin)
Spectrum News 1 serves Milwaukee, Madison, and Green Bay and the Fox Cities with three separate feeds; one for Milwaukee, one for Green Bay, and the Madison feed serving the rest of Spectrum's service area in the western, central and northern part of the state, originating from studios in downtown Milwaukee within Spectrum's regional headquarters, along with bureaus throughout the state. The network launched on November 28, 2018, effectively serving as the de facto replacement for Spectrum Sports (a network never added to Charter's legacy systems in the state after the Time Warner Cable purchase; ironically, Time Warner had considered launching an all-news channel in the region, but ultimately opted for a more scalable sports network instead), which had wound down its sports rights due to many of its partners taking their rights in-house or to new digital-only partners. Some of the latter network's staff remains with Spectrum News 1, along with an existing content agreement with the Green Bay Packers.

The network is carried on channel 1 universally throughout the state on Spectrum; as above with Kentucky, it displaced Spectrum's on demand service to the channel 999 shortcut. For viewers without automatic HD tuning, the channel is carried in high definition on channel 1001 on legacy Time Warner systems, and channel 700 on legacy Charter systems.

Spectrum News Massachusetts

In December 2019, Spectrum News 1 was launched in Massachusetts, serving the provider's systems in Central and Western Massachusetts, as well as southwestern New Hampshire. It serves areas including Worcester and Pittsfield. It de facto serves as an expansion of the news department for Charter's former regional network, Charter TV3, which Spectrum effectively replaced and was discontinued on October 23, 2020.

Related channels

NY1

NY1 (also known as Spectrum News NY1 and spoken as "New York One") serves the New York City metropolitan area, and is the only channel that restricts the "Spectrum News" name to a sub-brand. Although it shares content with the other Spectrum News channels, it maintains different programming than Charter's other New York-based news channels; it is the only such channel that does not carry Capital Tonight, but does produce its own specialty programs such as Inside City Hall (which is renamed Road to City Hall during New York City mayoral elections). The channel launched on September 8, 1992. Unlike the other Spectrum News channels, NY1 is carried on providers other than Charter (including Altice USA's New York City area systems and the Orlando and Tampa, Florida systems that were operated by Bright House Networks (which was managed by Time Warner Cable)) prior to their acquisition by Charter. It also operates NY1 Noticias for Spanish-speaking Hispanic American viewers along with NY1 Rail and Road for traffic and mass transit conditions around New York City. It is also carried some in Spectrum markets outside of the New York Tri-State region as a higher-tier digital offering, with local advertising bedded over with public service announcements.

Spectrum Bay News 9

Bay News 9 (also officially known as Spectrum Bay News 9 as of September 24, 2017) is a cable news television network located in St. Petersburg, Florida and began operating on September 24, 1997. It currently serves the Tampa Bay area including Hillsborough, Pinellas, Manatee, Polk, Pasco, Hernando, and Citrus counties.

Spectrum News 13

News 13 (also officially known as Spectrum News 13 as of September 24, 2017) is focused primarily on Central Florida, specifically Brevard, Flagler, Lake, Marion, Orange, Osceola, Seminole, Sumter, and Volusia counties. The channel originally launched on October 29, 1997 as Central Florida News 13; it was originally partnered with the Orlando Sentinel to help with 24-hour newsgathering operations and the channel was originally operated by Time Warner Cable, which relinquished cable television franchise rights in the Orlando metropolitan area to Bright House Networks in 2001.

See also
 News 12 Networks - a similar group of 24-hour regional cable news channels operated by Altice USA.
 FiOS1 - a similar group of 24-hour regional cable news channels operated by Verizon FiOS.

References

External links
 Official website

24-hour television news channels in the United States
Spectrum News channels